Stylochoerus was an extinct genus of even-toed ungulates that existed during the Pleistocene in Ethiopia.

References

Prehistoric Suidae
Pleistocene even-toed ungulates
Pleistocene mammals of Africa
Prehistoric even-toed ungulate genera